The Pine Jog Environmental Education Center is an education center located in Palm Beach County, Florida, United States. The center's mission is to develop, provide and model environmental education programs in order to promote an understanding of the earth and its inhabitants. The center is a unit of the College of Education of Florida Atlantic University.

References

External links
Pine Jog Official website
Florida Atlantic University Official website

Florida Atlantic University
Nature centers in Florida
Education in Palm Beach County, Florida
Protected areas of Palm Beach County, Florida